Christos Michas (1933 – 25 August 2010) was a Greek football referee who became the first Greek to officiate a European Cup final, the 1973 European Cup Winners' Cup Final. He belonged at the Athens association.

Career
Michas worked several high-profile matches, including four consecutive Greek Cup finals from 1968 to 1972, before being selected for European competitions. His performance at the 1973 European Cup Winners' Cup Final was widely criticized, leading to an investigation. UEFA banned Michas from refereeing for life following the investigation.

In 2009, Richard Corbett, an MEP for Yorkshire and Humber petitioned UEFA for a reversal of AC Milan's victory over Leeds United in the 1973 final.

References

External links

Profile at Worldreferee.com

1933 births
2010 deaths
Greek football referees